Anthony Muheria (born 27 May 1963) is a Kenyan Roman Catholic prelate who serves as Archbishop of the Roman Catholic Archdiocese of Nyeri. He was appointed as Archbishop of Nyeri on 23 April 2017.

Background and priesthood
Anthony Muheria was born on 27 May 1963, in Kaburugi Parish, in the Diocese of Muranga, in present-day Muranga County. After high school, he studied at the University of Nairobi, graduating in 1984, with a Bachelor of Science degree in Civil Engineering. He worked as a civil engineer for five years and then joined Opus Dei. He was sent to study at Pontifical University of the Holy Cross in Rome, where he graduated with a degree in Theology in 1993. He was ordained a priest on 13 June 1993. He served as a Priest of Opus Dei, until 30 October 2003.

As bishop
Father Muheria was appointed Bishop of Embu on 30 October 2003 and was consecrated a bishop at Embu on 10 January 2004 by Archbishop Giovanni Tonucci, Titular Archbishop of Torcello, assisted by Archbishop John Njue, Coadjutor Archbishop of Archdiocese of Nyeri and Archbishop Raphael Simon Ndingi Mwana’a Nzeki, of Archdiocese of Nairobi.

Bishop Muheria was appointed Bishop of Diocese of Kitui and apostolic administrator over Embu Diocese on 28 June 2008. His apostolic administration over Embu Diocese ceased on 25 July 2009.

On 21 February 2015, he was appointed apostolic administrator over the Diocese of Machakos. That apostolic administration ended on 25 August 2018.

On 23 April 2017, Bishop Anthony Muheria was appointed Archbishop of Nyeri Archdiocese. On the same day, he was appointed apostolic administrator of Kitui Diocese. That apostolic administration ended on 29 August 2020. 

On 17 June 2017, he was installed as Archbishop of Nyeri Archdiocese, succeeding Archbishop Emeritus Peter J. Kairo, who retired, after attaining the mandatory retirement age of 75 years.

References

External links

 Archbishop Anthony Muheria, conscience of the church As of 20 March 2020.
 About the Roman Catholic Archdiocese of Nyeri

1963 births
Living people
Kenyan Roman Catholics
People from Murang'a County
21st-century Roman Catholic bishops in Kenya
Pontifical University of the Holy Cross alumni
University of Nairobi alumni
Roman Catholic bishops of Kitui
Roman Catholic bishops of Machakos
Roman Catholic bishops of Embu